The 2012–13 Coupe de France was the 96th season of the most prestigious cup competition of France. The competition was organized by the French Football Federation (FFF) and open to all clubs in French football, as well as clubs from the overseas departments and territories (Guadeloupe, French Guiana, Martinique, Mayotte, New Caledonia, French Polynesia, and Réunion). The final was contested on 31 May 2013 at the Stade de France in Saint-Denis. The defending champions were Lyon, who defeated Quevilly 1–0 in the final of the 2011–12 season, but lost this season in the Round of 64 against Épinal. The winner of the competition, Bordeaux, qualified for the group stage of the 2013–14 UEFA Europa League.

Calendar 
On 1 June 2012, the FFF announced the calendar for the 96th Coupe de France season.

On 4 October 2012, the French Football Federation confirmed that the final of the Coupe de France would be moved up a day from 1 June to 31 May. The change occurred due to the final match of the 2012–13 Top 14 season being contested at the Stade de France on 1 June, which would have conflicted with the Coupe de France final.

Regional qualifying rounds 

All of the teams that enter the competition, but are not members of Ligue 1 or Ligue 2, have to compete in the regional qualifying rounds. The regional qualifying rounds determine the number of regional clubs that will earn spots in the 7th round and normally lasts six rounds.

Seventh Round 

The draw for the seventh round of the Coupe de France was held on 31 October 2012 at the headquarters of the Comité National Olympique et Sportif Français (CNOSF), the national sporting committee of France, and was conducted by Guy Ferrier, the France women's under-17 coach that won the 2012 FIFA U-17 Women's World Cup, as well as former footballers Jérôme Alonzo and Daniel Rodighiero. The overseas regional draw was conducted on the previous day. The matches will be played on 17–18 November.

Overseas region

Eighth round

|}

Round of 64

|}

Round of 32

Round of 16

Quarter-finals

Semi-finals 

Evian reached the semi-finals of the Coupe de France for the first time in their history.

Final 

Evian reached the final for the first time in their history. Bordeaux won their fourth Coupe de France – and first since 1987 – after a 3–2 victory against Evian.

Media coverage
For the fifth consecutive season in France, France Télévisions were the free to air broadcasters while Eurosport were the subscription broadcasters.

These matches were broadcast live on French television:

References

External links 

 

2012–13 domestic association football cups
2012–13 in French football
2012-13